Everett Range is a rugged, mainly ice-covered mountain range nearly  long between Greenwell Glacier and Ebbe Glacier in northwest Victoria Land, Antarctica. Mountains of the range include Mount Regina. These mountains lies situated on the Pennell Coast, a portion of Antarctica lying between Cape Williams and Cape Adare.

Discovery and naming

Everett Range was mapped by the United States Geological Survey from ground surveys and aerial photographs taken by the United States Navy in the period 1960–63. It was named by the Advisory Committee on Antarctic Names for Commander William H. Everett, U.S. Navy, Commander of Antarctic Squadron Six (VX-6), 1962–63.

References

Mountain ranges of Victoria Land
Pennell Coast